The United Nations Educational, Scientific and Cultural Organization (UNESCO) World Heritage Sites are places of importance to cultural or natural heritage as described in the UNESCO World Heritage Convention, established in 1972. Cultural heritage consists of monuments (such as architectural works, monumental sculptures, or inscriptions), groups of buildings, and sites (including archaeological sites). Natural features (consisting of physical and biological formations), geological and physiographical formations (including habitats of threatened species of animals and plants), and natural sites which are important from the point of view of science, conservation or natural beauty, are defined as natural heritage. Latvia accepted the convention on 10 January 1995, making its historical sites eligible for inclusion on the list. Both sites are cultural. The Struve Geodetic Arc is a transnational site and is shared with nine other countries. In addition to its World Heritage Sites, Latvia also maintains four properties on its tentative list.



World Heritage Sites 
UNESCO lists sites under ten criteria; each entry must meet at least one of the criteria. Criteria i through vi are cultural, and vii through x are natural.

Tentative list
In addition to sites inscribed on the World Heritage List, member states can maintain a list of tentative sites that they may consider for nomination. Nominations for the World Heritage List are only accepted if the site was previously listed on the tentative list. , Latvia lists four properties on its tentative list.

References

Latvia
Landmarks in Latvia
 
Protected areas of Latvia
World Heritage Sites
Cultural heritage of Latvia